The 2020 Florida Democratic presidential primary took place on March 17, 2020, the third primary Tuesday of the month, as one of three states voting on the same day in the Democratic Party primaries for the 2020 presidential election, while the contest in Ohio had been postponed for roughly a month. The Florida primary was a closed primary, with the state awarding the fourth-largest amount of delegates towards the 2020 Democratic National Convention and the third-largest amount up to that point: 249 delegates, of which 219 were pledged delegates allocated on the basis of the results of the primary.

Former vice president Joe Biden was the clear winner of the Florida primary, receiving almost 62% of the vote and 162 delegates, winning every county in the state and significantly extending his delegate lead. Senator Bernie Sanders placed second with only around 23% of the vote and 57 delegates, while former mayor Michael Bloomberg, who had already withdrawn, still got 8% of the vote.

Procedure
Florida was one of three states which held primaries on March 17, 2020, alongside Arizona and Illinois, while only one day before Ohio had been the first state to postpone its primary due to the COVID-19 pandemic and cancel in-person voting, accepting ballots until April 28 instead.

Voting took place throughout the state from 7:00 a.m. until 7:00 p.m. local time. In the closed primary, candidates had to meet a threshold of 15 percent at the congressional district or statewide level in order to be considered viable. The 219 pledged delegates to the 2020 Democratic National Convention were allocated proportionally on the basis of the results of the primary. Of these, between three and seven were allocated to each of the state's 27 congressional districts and another 29 were allocated to party leaders and elected officials (PLEO delegates), in addition to 47 at-large delegates. As a March primary on Stage I of the primary timetable Florida received no bonus delegates, in order to disperse the primaries between more different date clusters and keep too many states from hoarding on a March date.

Post-primary congressional district caucuses convened on May 2, 2020 to designate national convention district delegates. The state convention was subsequently held on May 30, 2020 to vote on the 47 at-large and 29 pledged PLEO delegates for the Democratic National Convention. The delegation also included 30 unpledged PLEO delegates: 16 members of the Democratic National Committee, 13 representatives from Congress (including former DNC chair Debbie Wasserman Schultz), and former DNC chair Kenneth M. Curtis.

Candidates
The following candidates qualified for the ballot in Florida:

Running

Joe Biden
Tulsi Gabbard
Bernie Sanders

Withdrawn

Michael Bennet
Michael Bloomberg
Cory Booker
Pete Buttigieg
Julian Castro
John Delaney
Amy Klobuchar
Deval Patrick
Joe Sestak
Tom Steyer
Elizabeth Warren
Marianne Williamson
Andrew Yang

Steve Bullock and Kamala Harris withdrew so that they did not appear on the ballot.

Polling

Results

Results by county

Notes
Additional candidates

See also
2020 Florida Republican presidential primary

References

External links
The Green Papers delegate allocation summary
Florida Democratic Party delegate selection plan 
FiveThirtyEight Florida primary poll tracker

Florida Democratic
Democratic primary
2020
Florida Democratic primary